Achille Consalvi was an Italian actor and film director of the silent era.

Selected filmography
 Fedora (1913)
 The Three Musketeers (1913)

References

Bibliography
 Grace Russo Bullaro. Beyond "Life is Beautiful": Comedy and Tragedy in the Cinema of Roberto Benigni. Troubador Publishing Ltd, 2005.

External links

Year of birth unknown
Year of death unknown
Italian film directors
Italian male film actors
Italian male silent film actors
20th-century Italian male actors